Nathan Nelson is an American politician serving in the Minnesota House of Representatives since 2019. A member of the Republican Party of Minnesota, Nelson represents District 11B in east-central Minnesota, which includes the cities of Mora, Rush City and Hinckley, and parts of Chisago, Kanabec and Pine Counties.

Early life, education, and career
Nelson was born in Hinckley, Minnesota, and grew up on a dairy farm. He graduated from Hinckley-Finlayson High School in 1997, and is a third-generation dairy farmer. 

Nelson was a member of the Clover Township Board of Supervisors for nine years and is the president of the Pine County Farm Bureau.

Minnesota House of Representatives
Nelson was elected to the Minnesota House of Representatives in a special election on March 19, 2019. He won a full term in November 2020 and was reelected in 2022. He first ran after three-term Republican incumbent Jason Rarick resigned to run for a seat in the Minnesota Senate.

Nelson serves on the Agriculture Finance and Policy, Children and Families Finance and Policy, and the Workforce Development Finance and Policy Committees.

Nelson advocated a wolf hunt, saying they are a big problem for farmers and ranchers in rural Minnesota. In 2022, he spoke out on a bill to address the 2021 drought and to fund rural broadband, calling it "too little, too late for many".

Electoral history

Personal life
Nelson lives in Hinckley with his spouse, Suzanna. They have five children.

References

External links

 Official House of Representatives website
 Official campaign website

Living people
Republican Party members of the Minnesota House of Representatives
21st-century American politicians
Year of birth missing (living people)
People from Hinckley, Minnesota
Farmers from Minnesota